Edward George McCullough (28 May 1909 – 17 June 1994) was a Canadian politician and farmer. McCullough was a Co-operative Commonwealth Federation member of the House of Commons of Canada. He was born in Moose Jaw, Saskatchewan and became a farmer.

He was first elected at the Assiniboia riding in the 1945 general election. In the 1949 election McCullough became a candidate at Moose Mountain but was defeated by John James Smith of the Liberal party. McCullough unseated Smith there in the 1953 election then was re-elected in 1957. McCullough was defeated in 1958 by Richard Southam of the Progressive Conservative party. McCullough was also unsuccessful in unseating Southam in the 1962 election, under the New Democratic Party to which the CCF was renamed by that time.

References

External links
 

1909 births
1994 deaths
Co-operative Commonwealth Federation MPs
20th-century Canadian politicians
Farmers from Saskatchewan
Members of the House of Commons of Canada from Saskatchewan
People from Moose Jaw